Gilberto Macedo da Macena (born 1 April 1984), commonly known as Gilberto Macena, is a Brazilian footballer who plays as a forward for Phitsanulok

Career
Macena arrived in Denmark in 2005, when he signed for the lower-division club Holbæk B&I. After one successful season in Holbæk, he moved to Danish Superliga team AC Horsens where he was the club top goalscorer on several occasions. After spending seven years in Denmark, Macena moved to Chinese Super League side Shandong Luneng on 16 February 2012 for an undisclosed fee.

On 11 January 2014, Macena transferred to Chinese Super League side Hangzhou Greentown. In January 2015, he made the move to Thai Premier League club Buriram United.

After his contract with Chiangrai United expired at the end of 2018, Macena returned to Denmark, in order to play for a contract. On 23 August 2019, it was confirmed that Macena had signed with his former club, Holbæk B&I. In 2020, he returned to his native Brazil to play for lower tier club Caçadorense.

Honour

Club 
Horsens
Danish 1st Division:2009–10

Buriram United
Thai Premier League:2015
Thai FA Cup:2015
Thai League Cup: 2015
Kor Royal Cup:2015
Mekong Club Championship:2015

Chiangrai United
 Thailand Champions Cup: 2018

Phitsanulok
 Thai League 3 Northern Region: 2022–23

Individual 
Danish 1st Division Top Scorer: 2009–10

References

External links 
 
 Career statistics at Danmarks Radio
 CBF BID  
 Futebol The Brazilian Way of Life

1984 births
Living people
Footballers from Rio de Janeiro (city)
Brazilian footballers
Brazilian expatriate footballers
Comercial Futebol Clube (Ribeirão Preto) players
AC Horsens players
Shandong Taishan F.C. players
Zhejiang Professional F.C. players
Gilberto Macena
Gilberto Macena
Al-Qadsiah FC players
Gilberto Macena
Gilberto Macena
Chinese Super League players
Danish Superliga players
Danish 1st Division players
Danish 2nd Division players
Saudi Professional League players
Association football forwards
Expatriate men's footballers in Denmark
Brazilian expatriate sportspeople in Denmark
Expatriate footballers in China
Brazilian expatriate sportspeople in China
Expatriate footballers in Thailand
Brazilian expatriate sportspeople in Thailand
Expatriate footballers in Saudi Arabia
Brazilian expatriate sportspeople in Saudi Arabia
Holbæk B&I players